Hurdiidae is an extinct cosmopolitan family of radiodonts, a group of stem-group arthropods, which lived during the Paleozoic Era. It is the most long-lived radiodont clade, lasting from the Cambrian period to the Devonian period.

Description

Hurdiidae is characterized by frontal appendages with distal region composed of 5 subequal blade-like endites, alongside the enlarged head carapaces and tetraradial mouthpart (oral cone).

The frontal appendages of hurdiids have a distinctive morphology, with the appendage of most species bearing five equally-sized elongate blade-like ventral spines known as endites. Subsequent podomeres were reduced in size and with only small endites or none. Each podomere bore only a single endite, unlike other radiodonts, in which the endites were paired. In most species, the endites were curved medially, so that the appendages formed a basket-like structure. Some hurdiids had greater numbers of endites, with Cordaticaris bearing seven endites of equal length. Ursulinacaris is unique among hurdiids in bearing paired endites, which is likely a transitional form between the appendage of other radiodonts and that of hurdiids.

Hurdiids exhibited a wide range of body size.

Paleobiology

The majority of hurdiids appear to have been predators that fed by sifting sediment with their frontal appendages, but Aegirocassis was a suspension feeder.

Distribution

Hurdiids had a global distribution. The earliest known hurdiid in the fossil record is Peytoia infercambriensis, which lived during the third age of the Cambrian in what is now the country of Poland. The group increased in diversity during the Miaolingian epoch. Post-Cambrian records of the group are rare, but the group lasted into the Devonian period, with the last known taxon being the Emsian Schinderhannes bartelsi from what is now Germany.

Classification

Hurdiidae is classified within Radiodonta, a clade of stem-group arthropods. Hurdiidae is defined phylogenetically as the most inclusive clade containing Hurdia victoria but not Amplectobelua symbrachiata, Anomalocaris canadensis, or Tamisiocaris borealis.

The phylogeny of hurdiids, accompanying the description of the hurdiids Aegirocassis benmoulae, Titanokorys gainesii, and the analyzation of Stanleycaris hirpex as follows:

Species include

 Aegeirocassis benmoulai
 Buccaspinea cooperi
 Cambroraster falcatus
 Cordaticaris striatus
 Hurdia triangulata
 Hurdia victoria
 Pahvantia hastata
 Peytoia nathorsti
 Peytoia infercambriensis
 Schinderhannes bartelsi
 Stanleycaris hirpex
 Titanokorys gainesii
 Ursulinacaris grallae
 Zhenghecaris shankouensis

References

Dinocarida
Cambrian Series 2 first appearances
Early Devonian extinctions
Prehistoric arthropod families